This article lists events from the year 2020 in Malawi.

Incumbents
 President: Peter Mutharika (until June 28), Lazarus Chakwera (from June 28)
 Vice-President: Everton Chimulirenji (until February 3) Saulos Chilima (from February 3)

Events

May 8 – The Supreme Court of Malawi rejects a bid from President Peter Mutharika and upholds a lower court ruling that annulled last year's elections, paving the way for a new election that will be held on July 2.
May 28 – A manhunt is launched after hundreds of people, some with COVID-19, escape from quarantine centers in Malawi, with authorities worried that they will spread COVID-19 in countries whose health systems can be rapidly overwhelmed.

Deaths
December 14 – Tarcisius Gervazio Ziyaye, 71, Roman Catholic prelate, Archbishop of Lilongwe (since 2001).

References

 
2020s in Malawi
Years of the 21st century in Malawi
Malawi
Malawi